Tapalapa is a town and one of the 119 Municipalities of Chiapas, in southern Mexico.

As of 2010, the municipality had a total population of 4,121, up from 3,639 as of 2005. It covers an area of 32.3 km².

As of 2010, the town of Tapalapa had a population of 1,940. Other than the town of Tapalapa, the municipality had 17 localities, none of which had a population over 1,000.

References

Municipalities of Chiapas